Rambluzin-et-Benoite-Vaux is a commune in the Meuse department in Grand Est in north-eastern France.

See also
Communes of the Meuse department
List of works by Henri Chapu

References

Rambluzinetbenoitevaux